Ogasawara Eisaku (born 11 September 1995) is a Japanese kickboxer. He is the reigning KNOCK OUT RED Featherweight champion and the former ISKA World Bantamweight K-1, WPMF Super Bantamweight and KNOCK OUT Super Bantamweight champion.

Martial arts career

Flyweight

Rebels Flyweight title reign
Ogasawara made his professional debut in July 2017 against Shoyo Yuasa, during the REBELS×IT’S SHOWTIME crossover event. Ogasawara won the fight by unanimous decision. 

After a KO victory in Thailand a month later, Eisaku went on a six fight winning streak, beating Tatakau Pastry, Naoya Yajima, Yasuhito Furuta, Yosuke Kafuji, Dynamo Puchi, and Kiminori Matsuzaki.

His eight fight winning streak earned him a chance to fight Hiroyuki Yamano for the REBELS-Muaythai Flyweight title. He defeated Yamano by unanimous decision.

After winning his first major title, Ogasawara would suffer his first professional loss in the very next fight. He was scheduled to fight Ryuji Kato during TNK1 feat.REBELS, and lost by KO in the first round. Ogasawara was then scheduled to fight Hong Chunhen, but once again lost by KO, after being dropped three times in the second round.

Eisaku would rebound from these losses by winning his next five fights. He beat Rose Tatsuya and Satoshi Katashima by TKO, and won decisions against Yasuhito Furuta, Yun Dok Jae and Jockylek GT-gym.

He was scheduled to fight for the MuayThaiOpen Super Flyweight title during MuayThaiOpen 30. Ogasawara won the fight by TKO in the second round, after knocking Takayuki down three times in the second round. The two of them fought a rematch four months later, during REBELS.37, for the REBELS 52.5kg title. Ogasawara once again won by TKO, this time in the first round.

Super bantamweight

ISKA and WPMF title wins
Ogasawara afterwards fought Yuko Ogata at BLADE.2, and won the fight by a first round KO. Eisaku then fought Munfan Acegym during Rebels 38, and won by unanimous decision. He scored knockout wins of Arashi Fujihara and Takashi Ohno, as well as a unanimous decision win over Taiki Naito.

Ogasawara was scheduled to fight the former RISE Bantamweight champion Yuta Murakoshi during RISE 112. Eisaku lost by a third round TKO. It was his first loss in nearly three years.

He rebounded from his loss with a 43 second KO of Masahide Kudo. Ogasawara won his next five fights by (T)KO as well, scoring victories over Keisuke Miyamoto, Hiroya Haga, Sung Ji Byun, Wanchalong PK.Saenchai and Hyo Sik Hwang.

Ogasawara was set to fight Franck Gross for the ISKA K-1 rules World Bantamweight title. Ogasawara won the fight by a unanimous decision. After a draw with Ryo Takahashi, Ogasawara fought Dawsakon Mor.Tassanai for the WPMF World Super Bantamweight title. He won the fight by a third round KO.

KNOCK OUT Super Bantamweight tournament
He suffered his fourth professional loss to Rui Ebata during KNOCK OUT SURVIVAL DAYS. Ebata won their fight by KO.

Eisaku fought in the Rajadamnern Stadium for the first time in August 2018, when he faced Jomkitti Sitanothai. He beat Jomkitti by a second round KO. He was then scheduled to fight King Kyosuke during Rebels 58, and won by unanimous decision. He rematched Ryo Takahashi during KING OF KNOCK OUT 2018, and won by unanimous decision. Eisaku beat Petyaso Dabrunsarakarm by a head kick KO at the Pancrase REBELS Ring 1. Eisaku extended his winning streak to five, with a decision win over Seiki Ueyama. He lost to Yuki Kasahara by TKO, after the ringside doctor stopped the fight in the second round.

Ogasawara entered the 2019 KNOCK OUT Super Bantamweight tournament. He won a unanimous decision against Mikel Fernandez in the semifinals, but lost a decision in turn in the finals, in a rematch with Rui Ebata.

Rebels 55.5 kg tournament
After his loss in the tournament finals, Ogasawara was scheduled to fight Saoek Sitchefboontham. Saoek  won by a second round head kick KO.

He won his next three fights, defeating Dekdoi TNmuaythai and Issei Saenchaigym by KO, and defeating Kaopong Por.Petchmanee by decision.

Ogasawara participated in the Rebels 55.5 kg tournament, facing Keisuke Miyamoto in the tournament semifinals. He won by majority decision. He is scheduled to face his brother Yukinori Ogasawara in the final for the inaugural REBELS-RED 55.5kg title. He was re-scheduled to fight King Kyosuke for the KNOCK OUT RED Super Bantamweight title. He won the fight with a body kick knockout, mid-way through the third round.

KNOCK OUT RED Super Bantamweight champion
Ogasawara was scheduled to face the former DEEP KICK 57.5kg champion Hiro Yokono in a non-title bout at KNOCK OUT 2021 vol.3 on July 18, 2021. He won the fight by a second-round knockout. Both the knockout and the knockdown that preceded it were scored it the same manner, by low kick, which Ogasawara had been throwing throughout the bout.

Ogasawara was scheduled to make his first KNOCK OUT title defense against Issei Saenchaigym at KNOCK OUT 2021 vol.6 on November 28, 2021. He won the fight by unanimous decision.

Ogasawara was booked to face Takuma Ota at KNOCK OUT 2022 vol.2 on March 12, 2022. He won the fight by unanimous decision.

Featherweight
Ogawasara vacated the Knock Out Red Super bantamweight title on August 18, 2022. On the same day, it was announced that Ogasawara would face Takeru for the vacant KNOCK OUT RED Featherweight title at KNOCK OUT 2022 vol.5 on September 23, 2022. He won the fight and the vacant title by a second-round knockout.

Ogasawara faced Chartpayak Saksatun at KNOCK OUT 2022 vol.8 on December 11, 2022. Despite twice knocking Chartpayak down, Ogasawara lost the fight by a third-round technical knockout, as his opponent was able to open a cut above Ogasawara's eye midway through the final round.

Ogasawara faced the three-weight Lumpinee Boxing Stadium champion Ronachai Tor.Ramintra at KNOCK OUT 2023 SUPER BOUT BLAZE on March 5, 2023. He won the fight by unanimous decision, with scores of 29–28, 30–28 and 30–27.

Titles and accomplishments

Professional
KNOCK OUT
2021 KNOCK OUT RED Super Bantamweight Champion
2022 KNOCK OUT RED Featherweight Champion

World Professional Muaythai Federation
2018 WPMF World Super Bantamweight Champion

International Sport Karate Association
2017 ISKA K-1 rules World Bantamweight Champion

REBELS
2013 REBELS Red Flyweight Champion
2015 REBELS Black Super Flyweight Champion

Muay Thai Open
2015 MuayThaiOpen Super Flyweight Champion

Amateur
 2009 KAMINARIMON -45kg Champion
 2010 M-1 Junior -45kg Champion

Fight record

|-  style="text-align:center; background:#cfc;"
| 2023-03-05 || Win ||align=left| Ronachai Tor.Ramintra || KNOCK OUT 2023 SUPER BOUT BLAZE  || Tokyo, Japan || Decision (Unanimous) || 3 ||3:00 

|-  style="text-align:center; background:#fbb;"
| 2022-12-11 || Loss ||align=left| Chartpayak Saksatun || KNOCK OUT 2022 vol.8  || Tokyo, Japan || TKO (Doctor stoppage/cut) || 3 || 1:22

|-  style="text-align:center; background:#cfc;"
| 2022-09-23 || Win ||align=left| Takeru Owaki|| KNOCK OUT 2022 vol.5  || Tokyo, Japan || KO (Right hook) || 2 || 0:58
|-
! style=background:white colspan=9 |
|-
|-  style="text-align:center; background:#cfc"
| 2022-03-12|| Win ||align=left| Takuma Ota || KNOCK OUT 2022 vol.2  || Tokyo, Japan || Decision (Unanimous) || 3 ||3:00
|-  style="text-align:center; background:#cfc;"
| 2021-11-28|| Win ||align=left| Issei Saenchaigym || KNOCK OUT 2021 vol.6  || Tokyo, Japan || Decision (Unanimous)  ||5 ||3:00
|-
! style=background:white colspan=9 |
|-  style="text-align:center; background:#cfc;"
| 2021-07-18|| Win ||align=left| Hiro Yokono || KNOCK OUT 2021 vol.3 || Tokyo, Japan || KO (Left low kick)  || 2 ||1:18
|-  style="text-align:center; background:#cfc;"
| 2021-03-13|| Win ||align=left| King Kyosuke || KNOCK OUT ～The REBORN～ || Tokyo, Japan ||  KO (Left middle kick) || 3 || 1:24
|-
! style=background:white colspan=9 |
|-  style="text-align:center; background:#cfc;"
| 2020-11-08|| Win ||align=left| Keisuke Miyamoto || REBELS 67, Red -55.5kg Championship Tournament Semi Final || Tokyo, Japan || Decision (Majority) || 3 || 3:00
|-  style="text-align:center; background:#cfc;"
| 2020-09-12|| Win ||align=left| Issei Saenchaigym || KNOCK OUT CHAMPIONSHIP.2 || Tokyo, Japan || KO (Right Hook)|| 1 || 1:37
|-  style="text-align:center; background:#CCFFCC;"
| 2020-02-11|| Win ||align=left| Kaopong Por.Petchmanee || Lumpinee Stadium || Bangkok, Thailand || Decision || 5 || 3:00
|-  style="text-align:center; background:#CCFFCC;"
| 2020-01-19|| Win ||align=left| Dekdoi TNmuaythai || Chang MuayThai Kiatpetch Super Fight, OrTorGor3 Stadium|| Nonthaburi, Thailand || KO (Low Kicks) || 3 ||
|-  style="text-align:center; background:#FFBBBB;"
| 2019-11-01|| Loss ||align=left| Saoek Sitchefboontham || KNOCK OUT 2019 BREAKING DAWN || Tokyo, Japan || KO (High Kick)|| 2 || 2:29
|-  style="text-align:center; background:#FFBBBB;"
| 2019-09-18|| Loss ||align=left| Rui Ebata || K.O CLIMAX 2019 SUMMER KICK FEVER, Super Bantamweight Tournament, Final || Tokyo, Japan || Decision (Unanimous) || 3 || 3:00
|-
! style=background:white colspan=9 |
|-  style="text-align:center; background:#CCFFCC;"
| 2019-08-18|| Win||align=left| Mikel Fernandez || K.O CLIMAX 2019 SUMMER KICK FEVER, Super Bantamweight Tournament, Semi Final || Tokyo, Japan || Decision (Unanimous) || 3 || 3:00
|-  style="text-align:center; background:#FFBBBB;"
| 2019-06-23|| Loss ||align=left| Yuki Kasahara || SHOOT BOXING 2019 act.3 || Tokyo, Japan || TKO (Doctor Stoppage) || 3 || 0:50
|-  style="text-align:center; background:#cfc;"
| 2019-04-27|| Win ||align=left| Seiki Ueyama || SHOOT BOXING 2019 act.2 || Tokyo, Japan || Decision (Unanimous) || 3 || 3:00
|-  style="text-align:center; background:#CCFFCC;"
| 2019-02-17|| Win ||align=left| Petyaso Dabrunsarakarm || Pancrase REBELS Ring 1 || Tokyo, Japan || KO (High Kick) || 1 || 1:28
|-  style="text-align:center; background:#CCFFCC;"
| 2018-12-09|| Win ||align=left| Ryo Takahashi || KING OF KNOCK OUT 2018 || Tokyo, Japan || Decision (Unanimous)|| 5 || 3:00
|-  style="text-align:center; background:#CCFFCC;"
| 2018-10-08|| Win ||align=left| King Kyosuke || REBELS.58 || Tokyo, Japan || Decision (Unanimous) || 5 || 3:00
|-  style="text-align:center; background:#CCFFCC;"
| 2018-08-22|| Win ||align=left| Jomkitti Sitanothai || Rajadamnern Stadium || Bangkok, Thailand || KO || 2 ||
|-  style="text-align:center; background:#FFBBBB;"
| 2018-06-08|| Loss ||align=left| Rui Ebata || KNOCK OUT SURVIVAL DAYS || Tokyo, Japan || KO (Punch) || 3 || 1:34
|-  style="text-align:center; background:#CCFFCC;"
| 2018-04-27|| Win ||align=left| Dawsakon Mor.Tassanai || REBELS.55 || Tokyo, Japan || KO (Right Hook) || 3 || 0:49
|-
! style=background:white colspan=9 |
|-  style="text-align:center; background:#c5d2ea;"
| 2017-12-10|| Draw ||align=left| Ryo Takahashi || KING OF KNOCK OUT 2017 || Tokyo, Japan || Decision || 5 || 3:00
|-  style="text-align:center; background:#CCFFCC;"
| 2017-09-06|| Win ||align=left| Franck Gross || REBELS.52 || Tokyo, Japan || Decision (Unanimous)|| 5 || 3:00
|-
! style=background:white colspan=9 |
|-  style="text-align:center; background:#CCFFCC;"
| 2017-08-20|| Win ||align=left| Hyo Sik Hwang || KNOCK OUT vol.4 || Tokyo, Japan || KO (Elbows) || 1 || 0:42
|-  style="text-align:center; background:#CCFFCC;"
| 2017-06-17|| Win ||align=left| Wanchalong PK.Saenchai || KNOCK OUT vol.3 || Tokyo, Japan || TKO (Corner Stoppage) || 5 || 1:10
|-  style="text-align:center; background:#CCFFCC;" 
| 2017-04-01|| Win ||align=left| Sung Ji Byun || KNOCK OUT vol.2 || Tokyo, Japan || TKO (Low kicks) || 3 || 1:32
|-  style="text-align:center; background:#CCFFCC;"
| 2017-02-12|| Win ||align=left| Hiroya Haga || KNOCK OUT vol.1 || Tokyo, Japan || TKO (Doctor Stoppage) || 2 || 1:13
|-  style="text-align:center; background:#CCFFCC;"
| 2016-12-05|| Win ||align=left| Keisuke Miyamoto || KNOCK OUT vol.0 || Tokyo, Japan || KO (Head Kick) || 2 || 2:53
|-  style="text-align:center; background:#CCFFCC;"
| 2016-10-23|| Win ||align=left| Masahide Kudo || REBELS.46 || Tokyo, Japan || KO (Right Hook)|| 1 || 0:43
|-  style="text-align:center; background:#FFBBBB;"
| 2016-07-30|| Loss ||align=left| Yuta Murakoshi || RISE 112 || Tokyo, Japan || TKO (Corner Stoppage) || 3 || 1:53
|-  style="text-align:center; background:#CCFFCC;"
| 2016-06-01|| Win ||align=left| Taiki Naito || REBELS.43 || Tokyo, Japan || Decision (Unanimous) || 3 || 3:00
|-  style="text-align:center; background:#CCFFCC;"
| 2016-03-09|| Win ||align=left| Takashi Ohno || REBELS.41 || Tokyo, Japan || TKO || 3 || 2:29
|-  style="text-align:center; background:#CCFFCC;"
| 2015-12-13|| Win ||align=left| Arashi Fujihara || MuayThaiOpen 33 ＆ Lumpinee Boxing Stadium of Japan || Tokyo, Japan || KO (Left Hook)|| 1 || 1:34
|-  style="text-align:center; background:#CCFFCC;"
| 2015-09-16|| Win ||align=left| Munfan Acegym || REBELS.38 || Tokyo, Japan || Decision (Unanimous) || 3 || 3:00
|-  style="text-align:center; background:#CCFFCC;"
| 2015-08-01|| Win ||align=left| Yuko Ogata || BLADE.2 -BLADE FIGHTING CHAMPIONSHIP- BLADE FC JAPAN CUP -55kg || Tokyo, Japan || KO (Left Hook)|| 1 || 1:32
|-  style="text-align:center; background:#CCFFCC;"
| 2015-07-12|| Win ||align=left| Yuki Ueba || REBELS.37 || Tokyo, Japan || TKO (Corner stoppage) || 1 || 1:40
|-
! style=background:white colspan=9 |
|-  style="text-align:center; background:#CCFFCC;"
| 2015-03-22|| Win ||align=left| Takayuki Saenchaigym || MuayThaiOpen 30 || Tokyo, Japan || TKO (3 Knockdowns) || 2 || 1:47
|-
! style=background:white colspan=9 |
|-  style="text-align:center; background:#CCFFCC;"
| 2015-01-25|| Win ||align=left| Satoshi Katashima || REBELS.33 || Tokyo, Japan || TKO (Corner Stoppage) || 5 || 0:48
|-  style="text-align:center; background:#CCFFCC;"
| 2014-10-26|| Win ||align=left| Jockylek GT-gym || REBELS.31 || Tokyo, Japan || Decision (Majority)|| 3 || 3:00
|-  style="text-align:center; background:#CCFFCC;"
| 2014-07-25|| Win ||align=left| Yun Dok Jae || RISE cooperation REBELS.28 || Tokyo, Japan || Decision (Unanimous) || 3 || 3:00
|-  style="text-align:center; background:#CCFFCC;"
| 2014-04-20|| Win ||align=left| Yasuhito Furuta || REBELS.26 ～the duel～ || Tokyo, Japan || Decision (Unanimous) || 3 || 3:00
|-  style="text-align:center; background:#CCFFCC;"
| 2014-01-26|| Win ||align=left| Rose Tatsuya || REBELS.23 || Tokyo, Japan || TKO (Doctor Stoppage)|| 5 || 0:37
|-  style="text-align:center; background:#FFBBBB;"
| 2013-12-20|| Loss ||align=left| Hong Chunhen || Titan Fight, Samurai vs Khmer || Cambodia || TKO (3 Knockdowns) || 2 ||
|-  style="text-align:center; background:#FFBBBB;"
| 2013-06-09|| Loss ||align=left| Ryuji Kato || TNK1 feat.REBELS || Gunma, Japan || KO || 1 || 1:15
|-  style="text-align:center; background:#CCFFCC;"
| 2013-05-06|| Win ||align=left| Hiroyuki Yamano || REBELS.16 || Tokyo, Japan || Decision (Unanimous)|| 5 || 3:00 
|-
! style=background:white colspan=9 |
|-  style="text-align:center; background:#CCFFCC;"
| 2013-01-27|| Win ||align=left| Kiminori Matsuzaki || REBELS.14 || Tokyo, Japan || Decision (Unanimous)|| 5 || 3:00
|-  style="text-align:center; background:#CCFFCC;"
| 2012-09-16|| Win ||align=left| Dynamo Puchi || J-GIRLS 2012 ～Platinum’s In The Ring 4th～ || Tokyo, Japan || Decision (Unanimous)|| 5 || 3:00
|-  style="text-align:center; background:#CCFFCC;"
| 2012-08-26|| Win ||align=left| Yosuke Kafuji || J-NETWORK J-KICK 2012～NEXT J-GENERATION～4th || Tokyo, Japan || Decision (Unanimous)|| 3 || 3:00
|-  style="text-align:center; background:#CCFFCC;"
| 2012-04-15|| Win ||align=left| Yasuhito Furuta || REBELS.11 || Tokyo, Japan || Decision (Unanimous) || 3 || 3:00
|-  style="text-align:center; background:#CCFFCC;"
| 2012-01-22|| Win ||align=left| Naoya Yajima || REBELS.10 || Tokyo, Japan || Decision (Unanimous) || 3 || 3:00
|-  style="text-align:center; background:#CCFFCC;"
| 2011-10-23|| Win ||align=left| Tatakau Pastry || REBELS.9 || Tokyo, Japan || Decision (Unanimous) || 3 || 3:00
|-  style="text-align:center; background:#CCFFCC;"
| 2011-08-28|| Win ||align=left|  ||  || Thailand || KO || 2 ||
|-  style="text-align:center; background:#CCFFCC;"
| 2011-07-18|| Win ||align=left| Shoyo Yuasa || REBELS×IT’S SHOWTIME ～REBELS.8 & IT’S SHOWTIME JAPAN  || Tokyo, Japan || Decision (Unanimous) || 3 || 3:00 
|-
| colspan=9 | Legend:    

|- style="background:#c5d2ea;"
| 2013-02-16|| Draw|| align="left" | Tenshin Nasukawa || Kichijoji Fight Club || Tokyo, Japan || Decision || 3 || 2:00
|-  style="background:#FFBBBB;"
| 2011-06-05|| Loss|| align=left| Takayuki Komamura || Muay Yoko 15, Final || Tokyo, Japan || Decision || 3 ||2:00
|-  style="background:#CCFFCC;"
| 2011-06-05|| Win|| align=left| Hyuhi Segawa || Muay Yoko 15, Semi Final || Tokyo, Japan || TKO || 1 ||
|-  style="background:#CCFFCC;"
| 2011-04-24|| Win|| align=left| Ren Hiramoto || REBELS.7 || Tokyo, Japan || Decision || 3 ||2:00
|-  style="background:#fbb;"
| 2010-12-12|| Loss|| align=left| Sumiya Ito || M-1 Muay Thai Amateur 39|| Tokyo, Japan || Decision || 3 ||2:00
|-
! style=background:white colspan=9 |
|-  style="background:#fbb;"
| 2010-08-29|| Loss|| align=left| Takumi Nakura|| M-1 Muay Thai Amateur 36 - M-1 Kid's CHAMPION CARNIVAL 2010 2nd|| Tokyo, Japan || Decision || 3 ||2:00
|-
! style=background:white colspan=9 |

|-  style="background:#CCFFCC;"
| 2010-07-19|| Win|| align=left| Ryosuke Otake|| REBELS.3|| Tokyo, Japan || KO (Left Cross)|| 1 ||0:40
|-
! style=background:white colspan=9 |

|-  style="background:#c5d2ea;"
| 2010-04-25|| Draw|| align=left| Hiromasa Ozaki || RISE 64 || Tokyo, Japan || Decision || 2 ||2:00
|- style="background:#CCFFCC;"
| 2010-03-28|| Win || align="left" | Hayate Kaji ||M-1 Muay Thai Amateur 33 - M-1 Kid's CHAMPION CARNIVAL 2010||Tokyo, Japan|| Decision (Unanimous)|| 3 ||
|-
! style=background:white colspan=9 |
|-  style="background:#CCFFCC;"
| 2010-01-23|| Win|| align=left| Shokichi Iwata || REBELS || Tokyo, Japan || Decision || 2 ||2:00
|-  style="background:#CCFFCC;"
| 2009-11-22|| Win|| align=left| Ryusei Kondo|| KAMINARIMON|| Tokyo, Japan || Decision  ||  ||
|-
! style=background:white colspan=9 |
|-  style="background:#CCFFCC;"
| 2009-10-25|| Win|| align=left| Ryusei Kondo|| KAMINARIMON, Final|| Tokyo, Japan || Decision (Unanimous) || 1 || 2:00
|-  style="background:#CCFFCC;"
| 2009-10-25|| Win|| align=left| Keito Obinata || KAMINARIMON, Semi Final|| Tokyo, Japan || Decision (Unanimous) || 1 || 2:00
|-  style="background:#fbb;"
| 2009-09-27|| Loss|| align=left| Tokio Yachuda|| KAMINARIMON|| Tokyo, Japan || Decision (Unanimous)  ||  ||
|-  style="background:#CCFFCC;"
| 2009-09-27|| Win|| align=left| Kyosuke Oyama || KAMINARIMON|| Tokyo, Japan || KO || 1 ||
|-  style="background:#CCFFCC;"
| 2009-08-23|| Win|| align=left| Ryusei Watanabe || KAMINARIMON|| Tokyo, Japan || KO || 2 ||
|-  style="background:#CCFFCC;"
| 2009-02-22|| Win|| align=left| Ryusei Kondo || KAMINARIMON|| Tokyo, Japan || Decision (Unanimous) ||  ||
|-  style="background:#CCFFCC;"
| 2009-02-22|| Win|| align=left| Ryusei Watanabe || KAMINARIMON|| Tokyo, Japan || Decision (Unanimous) ||  ||
|-
| colspan=9 | Legend:

See also
List of male kickboxers

References

Living people
1995 births
Japanese male kickboxers
Flyweight kickboxers
Japanese Muay Thai practitioners
People from Tokyo
Sportspeople from Tokyo